Tsandzile Ndwandwe, also known as LaZidze (daughter of Zidze), was an Ndlovukati or senior queen of Swaziland from July 1868 until June 1875. 

She was the daughter of Zwide kaLanga, the senior wife of Sobhuza I of Swaziland, and the mother of Mswati II of Swaziland.

References

19th-century African people
Women rulers in Africa
African queens
19th-century women rulers